The Academy of Canadian Cinema and Television presents an annual award for Best Achievement in Direction to the best work by a director of a Canadian film.

History
The award was first presented in 1966 by the Canadian Film Awards, and was presented annually until 1978 with the exception of 1974 due to the cancellation of the awards that year. From 1980 until 2012, the award was presented as part of the Genie Awards ceremony; since 2013, it has been presented as part of the Canadian Screen Awards.

1960s

1970s

1980s

1990s

2000s

2010s

2020s

Directors with multiple wins (3 or more)
David Cronenberg-5
Denis Villeneuve-4
Denys Arcand-3

Directors with multiple nominations (3 or more)
David Cronenberg-9 times (5 wins)
Atom Egoyan-9 times (2 wins)
Xavier Dolan-5 times (2 wins)
Denis Villeneuve-4 times (4 wins)
Denys Arcand-4 times (3 wins)
Bob Clark-3 times (2 wins; co-tie with Cronenberg)

See also
Prix Iris for Best Director

References

 
Awards for best director
Director
Awards established in 1966